The Women's pursuit competition of the Beijing 2022 Olympics was held on 13 February, at the National Biathlon Centre, in the Zhangjiakou cluster of competition venues,  north of Beijing, at an elevation of . Marte Olsbu Røiseland of Norway won the event. Elvira Öberg of Sweden won the silver medal, and Tiril Eckhoff of Norway the bronze.

Summary
The 2018 champion, Laura Dahlmeier, and the silver medalist, Anastasiya Kuzmina, retired from competitions. The 2018 bronze medalist, Anaïs Bescond, qualified for the Olympics, but in the 2021–22 Biathlon World Cup ranking before the Olympics she was tenth. The overall leader of the 2021–22 Biathlon World Cup before the Olympics, as well as the leader in the pursuit, was Olsbu Røiseland.

Olsbu Røiseland, who won the sprint, started first, did not miss a target at two shootings, and missed one target on the third one. At the third shooting, her next pursuer, Wierer, was already 45 seconds behind, and missed two targets, dropping down to 1:25. They were followed by Lisa Theresa Hauser and Ingrid Landmark Tandrevold 1:40 behind Olsbu Røiseland. At the fourth shooting, Olsbu Røiseland did not miss targets, which guaranteed her the gold medal. Silver and bronze remained open until very late in the race. Öberg, who left the shooting second behind Olsbu Røiseland, finished second, but Tandrevold who was a few seconds behind Öberg in a bronze medal position, collapsed and dropped out of the top ten. Eckhoff finished third.

Qualification

Results
The race was started at 17:00.  The race distance was 10km.

References

Biathlon at the 2022 Winter Olympics
Women's biathlon at the 2022 Winter Olympics